The fourth series of the BBC espionage television series Spooks began broadcasting on 12 September 2005 before ending on 10 November 2005. The series consists of ten episodes.

Cast
Main
 Rupert Penry-Jones as Adam Carter
 Olga Sosnovska as Fiona Carter
 Raza Jaffrey as Zafar Younis
 Miranda Raison as Jo Portman
 Hugh Simon as Malcolm Wynn-Jones
 Rory MacGregor as Colin Wells
with Nicola Walker as Ruth Evershed
and Peter Firth as Harry Pearce

Guests
 Anna Chancellor as Juliet Shaw
James Dicker as Wes Carter
 William Armstrong as Alex Roscoe
 Phyllis Logan as Diana Jewell
 Lindsay Duncan as Angela Wells (episode 10)

Episodes

Notes

References

External links
 

2005 British television seasons
Spooks (TV series)